Francesco de Marchi (1610 - 1 Nov 1667) was a Roman Catholic prelate who served as Bishop of Krk (1660–1667).

Biography
Francesco de Marchi was born in Split, Croatia in 1610. On 21 Jun 1660, he was appointed during the papacy of Pope Alexander VII as Bishop of Krk. On June 27th 1660, he was consecrated bishop by Giulio Cesare Sacchetti, Cardinal-Bishop of Sabina, with Lorenzo Gavotti, Bishop Emeritus of Ventimiglia, with Giovanni Agostino Marliani, Bishop Emeritus of Accia and Mariana, serving as co-consecrators. He served as Bishop of Krk until his death on 1 Nov 1667.

References 

17th-century Roman Catholic bishops in Croatia
Bishops appointed by Pope Alexander VII
1610 births
1667 deaths
Clergy from Split, Croatia